"Outlaw" is a song written by Tim Kellett and Robin Taylor-Firth, and performed by British trip hop group Olive on their 1996 album Extra Virgin. It was released as the follow-up to the group's number one single "You're Not Alone". The single charted at number fourteen in the UK Singles Chart.

Lyrics
The lyric concerns a woman's discovery that her boyfriend has been sleeping with another man. The main chorus couplet - "Couldn't you have told me before? / I would have loved you so much more" - suggests that her problem is not so much that her boyfriend is gay or bisexual, but simply that he lied to her about himself, and that under other circumstances they could have been good friends.

Critical reception
A reviewer from Music Week rated the song three out of five, adding, "Nowhere near as ear-grabbing as its chart-topping predecessor, this is pleasant but too losely formed to make any lasting impact." The magazine's Alan Jones wrote, "Their new single Outlaw is quite different, and quite charming, with the most subdued drum & beats fused to a probing bassline overlaid with Ruth-Ann's sweet vocals."

Track listing
 UK CD single
 "Outlaw" (Radio Edit)
 "Outlaw" (Black Olive's Extended Mix)
 "Outlaw" (Phunk Phorce Mix)
 "Outlaw" (The Space Brothers Remix)
 "Outlaw" (Billy Gonzo's Dogg Mix)

References

1997 singles
Olive (band) songs
Songs written by Tim Kellett
Songs written by Robin Taylor-Firth
1997 songs
RCA Records singles